Kareepra  is a village near Edakkidom in Kollam district in the state of Kerala, India.

Demographics
 India census, Kareepra had a population of 28,888 with 13,817 males and 15,071 females. Edakkidom

References

Villages in Kollam district